Michael Arthur Carpenter (born September 18, 1936 in Birmingham, England) is a Canadian former tennis player. Carpenter won the Canadian Open 1966 doubles title playing alongside his younger brother, and more accomplished player, Keith Carpenter. Carpenter played tennis for McGill University in his hometown of Montreal.

References

1936 births
Living people
Canadian male tennis players
Canadian expatriate sportspeople in England
English emigrants to Canada
Naturalized citizens of Canada
Sportspeople from Birmingham, West Midlands